The Theban Tomb TT14 is located in Dra' Abu el-Naga'. It forms part of the Theban Necropolis, situated on the west bank of the Nile opposite Luxor. The tomb is the burial place of the ancient Egyptian Huy, who was a wab-priest of Amenhotep, the favorite of Amun''.

See also
 List of Theban tombs

References

Theban tombs